The Dakota Tavern is a live music venue and bar in Toronto, Ontario, Canada.

History 
The Dakota opened in 2007. It's co-owned by business partners. It is located in the Little Italy neighbourhood of Toronto.

The bar participates as a venue yearly for North by Northeast. The venue also hosts a recurring event on weekends Bluegrass Brunch.

In 2020, owners of the bar expressed concerns about rising insurance prices during the COVID-19 pandemic in Toronto and considered closing.

Notable acts

House band 

The house band for the venue are The Beauties.

References 

Music venues completed in 2007
Music venues in Toronto